Travis MacKenzie (born June 3, 1986 in Carnegie, Pennsylvania) is an American soccer player And Associate Head Coach of The Chartiers Valley Colts Soccer Team who last played for Pittsburgh Riverhounds in the USL Second Division.

Career

College and Amateur
MacKenzie attended Chartiers Valley High School where amongst other awards he was an NSCAA All-American, a two-time Regional All-American, a three-time All-State selection, and the 2004 Almanac Athlete of the Year.

He subsequently played four years of college soccer at the Duquesne University, where he had an equally stellar career; he was a member of the Atlantic 10 All-Rookie Team and the Atlantic 10 Pre-Season All-Rookie Team as a freshman in 2004, was an NSCAA Mid-Atlantic All-Region Second Team and Atlantic 10 First Team All-Conference selection as a sophomore in 2005, was a member of the NSCAA Mid-Atlantic All-Region First, Atlantic 10 First Team All-Conference and Atlantic 10 Pre-Season All-Conference teams as a junior in 2005, and was on the Hermann Trophy Watch List prior to his senior season in 2007.

Professional
MacKenzie turned professional in 2008 when he signed for the Pittsburgh Riverhounds of the USL Second Division. He made his professional outdoor debut on April 19, 2008 in the team's 2008 season opener against the Cleveland City Stars, scored his first professional goal on June 7, 2008 in a 5-3 defeat to the Wilmington Hammerheads, and finished his freshman season with three goals in 19 games.

He subsequently played two seasons of pro indoor soccer with the Milwaukee Wave of the Major Indoor Soccer League in 2008-09 and 2009–10; in two seasons with the Wave he accumulated up 26 points in 21 games, including 7 goals, before returning to the Riverhounds in 2010

References

External links
Pittsburgh Riverhounds bio 
Milwaukee Wave bio
Duquesne bio

1988 births
Living people
American soccer players
Pittsburgh Riverhounds SC players
Duquesne Dukes men's soccer players
Soccer players from Pennsylvania
USL Second Division players
Milwaukee Wave players
People from Carnegie, Pennsylvania
Association football midfielders